The following is a list of countries by car exports.

By value 
Data is for 2021, in billions of United States dollars. The top fifteen countries are listed:

By number
Data is for 2021, in millions of cars:

See also 
List of countries by car imports

References

Car
car exports